Line 9 of the Madrid Metro is a rapid transit line in Madrid that originally opened on 31 January 1980 between Sainz de Baranda and Pavones. Later it was extended from Avenida de América to Herrera Oria on 3 June 1983, though this section was at the time separate from the original part until the missing fragment from Avenida de América to Sainz de Baranda was opened on 24 February 1986.

History
The stations in this section were marked with a unique wall color in each station, making it easy to spot one's destination from the train. For example, Pavones is white, Valdebernardo is yellow, Vicálvaro is a light shade of turquoise, and San Cipriano is orange. This approach is being applied in many other new or recently refurbished stations like Sevilla on Line 2, though there is no representation of the colours on official system maps.

On 11 July 2008, the infill station Rivas Futura opened, located between Rivas-Urbanizaciones and Rivas Vaciamadrid.

On 28 March 2011, the line was extended north from Herrera Oria to Mirasierra. Originally, this station was to be named Costa Brava, but because musician and guitarist Paco de Lucía died in 2014, the Transport Authorities decided to change its name to pay tribute. A Cercanías railway station opened on 5 February 2018, providing a connection between the two rail systems.

Line 9B
At Puerta de Arganda, an island platform was built, so passengers who required to use the southern extension ("line 9B") can move directly across the platform to from the primary route ("line 9A"). This southern extension runs through mostly unpopulated areas connecting the two towns of Rivas-Vaciamadrid and Arganda del Rey. The line runs with only two or three car trains at comparatively long intervals through scenic landscape of Spanish desert. Rivas-Urbanizaciones and Arganda del Rey are underground stations with large island platforms, and Rivas Futura, Rivas Vaciamadrid and La Poveda are surface stations with side platforms. Given the continuous growth of particularly Rivas-Vaciamadrid, there are many plans for the future of Line 9B. Most concretely, the municipal government intends to construct a new station at Calle José Saramago between Rivas-Urbanizaciones and Rivas Futura and to cover a stretch of tracks to remedy the current state of surface segments effectively cutting the city in half.

Rolling stock
Class 5000 and 9000 usually run on Line 9A with occasional class 6000s, and class 6000s usually run on Line 9B.

See also
 Madrid
 Transport in Madrid
 List of Madrid Metro stations
 List of metro systems

References

External links

  Madrid Metro (official website)
 Schematic map of the Metro network – from the official site 
 Madrid at UrbanRail.net
 ENGLISH User guide, ticket types, airport supplement and timings
 Network map (real-distance)
 Madrid Metro Map

09
Railway lines opened in 1980
1980 establishments in Spain